|}

The Pontefract Castle Stakes is a Listed flat horse race in Great Britain open to filies and mares aged four years or older.
It is run at Pontefract over a distance of 1 mile 4 furlongs and 5 yards (2,419 metres), and it is scheduled to take place each year in June.

The race was first run in 2005. It was originally open to horses of either sex but was restricted to fillies and mares from the 2017 running.

Records

Most successful horse (2 wins):
 Brown Panther  – 2012, 2013

Leading jockey (2 wins):
 Harry Bentley – Isabel De Urbina (2018), Antonia De Vega (2020)
 Ryan Moore -  Abingdon (2017), Katara (2021) 

Leading trainer (2 wins):
 Ralph Beckett – Isabel De Urbina (2018), Antonia De Vega (2020)
Luca Cumani – Connecticut (2015), Loving Things (2016)
Tom Dascombe – Brown Panther (2012,2013)
 Michael Stoute - Abingdon (2017), Katara (2021) ''

Winners

See also 
Horse racing in Great Britain
List of British flat horse races

References

Racing Post:

Flat races in Great Britain
Pontefract Racecourse
Long-distance horse races for fillies and mares
Recurring sporting events established in 2005
2005 establishments in England